Urupukapuka Island is the largest island in the Bay of Islands of New Zealand, located about 7.3 km from Paihia.  The island is a popular stopover point for tour boats to the Hole in the Rock and is also serviced by ferries for day trips from Paihia and Russell.

History
Urupukapuka Island was previously settled by the Ngare Raumati tribe, one of the oldest tribes of the area. In 1839, William Brind, a whaling captain, claimed to have purchased 150 acres of Urupukapuka from Rewa, a chief of the Ngapuhi tribe, for one mare valued at 45 English pounds. The claim was invalidated when Rewa claimed that the mare represented a mere deposit and not the whole lump sum amount.  
In the later 1800s, two Europeans leased some of the land on Urupukapuka for grazing and began to clear the island and build a fenceline.

In 1927, Otehei Bay had become the base of the fishing expeditions of the American author Zane Grey, and a world-famous fishing resort was later established there.

Geography
The island is 208 hectares (514 acres) in size. There are many sandy beaches. The waters around the island are clear and diving is particularly good on the east coast where there is plentiful reef life.
Indico and Paradise Bays are popular sheltered anchorages and ideal for most forms of water sports. The bays are also inhabited by a colony of shags, and pohutukawas are abundant along the coastline. The New Zealand dotterel, oystercatcher, pied stilt and paradise duck breed on the island. The archeological features of Urupukapuka are interesting because of their range, the diversity of sites, and their good state of preservation. An archeological walk with on-site signs interprets many of the pre-European sites on the island. Urupukapuka is ideal for 'back to nature' camping. The informal camping is made possible by combining farming with recreation.

References

Far North District
Islands of the Bay of Islands